Grote Kerk may refer to:

 Grote Kerk, De Rijp, a Protestant church in De Rijp, Netherlands
 Grote Kerk, Dordrecht, a Protestant church in Dordrecht, Netherlands
 Grote Kerk, Haarlem, a Protestant church and former Catholic cathedral in Haarlem, Netherlands
 Grote Kerk (Breda), a monument and a landmark of Breda, Netherlands
 Grote of Sint-Jacobskerk (The Hague), a Protestant church in The Hague, The Netherlands
 Grote of Sint-Laurenskerk (Rotterdam), a Protestant church and landmark of Rotterdam

See also
 Groote Kerk (disambiguation)